The Women's 4 × 100 m Medley Relay at the 2006 Commonwealth Games occurred on Tuesday, 21 March 2006 at the Melbourne Sports and Aquatic Centre in Melbourne, Australia. It was the second-to-last event of the swimming program at the Games, and the last women's event (the final event was the Men's 4x100 Medley Relay).

As 8 teams were entered in the event, it was only swum in finals.

Records at the start of the competition were:
World Record (WR): 3:57.32, Australia, 21 August 2004, Athens Greece
Games Record (GR): 4:03.70, Australia, Manchester 2002.

Results

See also
Swimming at the 2010 Commonwealth Games – Women's 4 × 100 metre medley relay

References

Swimming at the 2006 Commonwealth Games
2006 in women's swimming